Now Healthcare Group was a health technology company founded in 2014 based in Salford. Lee Dentith is the  founder and chief executive.

Medicash was a substantial investor in the company.  It has been approved by the Care Quality Commission and is said to have 20 million customers.

It closed in May 2020 after losing the Aviva contract.

Products
It provides digital GP services to Aviva clients, using its mobile app, Aviva Digital GP, which allows people to book video consultations with a GP, get remote diagnoses and  advice on simple medical queries.

Now Pharmacy, in Liverpool, is a "tele-pharmacy super hub".  It will be able dispense around 500,000 prescriptions per month. It uses robotics technology, called Rowa and made by Becton, Dickinson.

An artificial intelligence mobile app called Now Patient is used in Now Pharmacy for patients with chronic health conditions. 

Its video consultation platform, Now GP, is being trials by five groups of NHS practices and one additional large practice.  The company also employs its own GPs.  It is being offered free. Patients will be asked if they would like Now Pharmacy to deliver any prescribed medicine. It will forward their prescription to a local pharmacy as a ‘click-and-collect’.  This service is already offered to the company's private medical insurance clients.  It claims this will help over-stretched NHS services.

References

Companies based in Salford
Medical technology companies of the United Kingdom